The Decoy is the name of a number of films:

The Decoy (1914 film) 
The Decoy (1915 film) 
The Decoy (1916 film) 
The Decoy (1918 film) 
The Decoy (2006 film)